The Siloam inscription or Shiloah inscription (or Silwan inscription,) known as KAI 189, is a Hebrew inscription found in the Siloam tunnel which brings water from the Gihon Spring to the Pool of Siloam, located in the City of David in East Jerusalem neighborhood of Shiloah or Silwan. The inscription records the construction of the tunnel, which has been dated to the 8th century BC on the basis of the writing style. It is the only known ancient inscription from ancient Israel and Judah which commemorates a public construction work, despite such inscriptions being commonplace in Egyptian and Mesopotamian archaeology.

It is among the oldest extant records of its kind written in Hebrew using the Paleo-Hebrew alphabet, a regional variant of the Phoenician alphabet. The inscription is held by the Istanbul Archaeology Museum.

Turkey has denied Israel's requests to be sent the inscription, on the basis that it was found in what is today East Jerusalem, which is considered occupied Palestinian territory under international law by the vast majority of the international community, though Israel disputes this.

History

Discovery
The Siloam tunnel was discovered in 1838 by Edward Robinson. Despite the tunnel being examined extensively during the 19th century by Robinson, Charles Wilson, and Charles Warren, they all missed discovering the inscription, probably due to the accumulated mineral deposits making it barely noticeable.

In 1880 a 16-year-old pupil of Conrad Schick, head of the London Society for Promoting Christianity Amongst the Jews' institute for vocational training, found the inscription when exploring the tunnel. It was cut in the rock on the eastern side, about 19 feet into the tunnel from Siloam Pool. Schick explained in his initial publication Phoenician Inscription in the Pool of Siloam:
...one of my pupils, when climbing down the southern side of [the aqueduct], stumbled over the broken bits of rock and fell into the water. On rising to the surface, he discovered some marks like letters on the wall of rock. I set off with the necessary things to examine his discovery.

The pupil was later identified as Jacob Eliahu (later Spafford, following his subsequent adoption by Horatio Spafford). Seventy years later, in 1950, Eliahu's adoptive sister, Bertha Spafford Vester, wrote of the discovery story, which took place a year prior to her arrival in the city:
Jacob was above the average in intellect, with the oriental aptitude for languages. He spoke five fluently, with a partial knowledge of several others. He was interested in archaeology, and the year before we came to Jerusalem he discovered the Siloam Inscription... His imagination was fired by learning about the subterranean tunnel in the Ophal Hill that had been excavated by King Hezekiah to bring water inside the threatened city... It is supposed to be haunted by a dragon or genie... Nevertheless, Jacob determined to explore the tunnel... Jacob, feeling his way, suddenly was conscious that the chisel marks had changed and were now going from left to right. He realized he must be in the exact place where the King's workmen had met under the city. Carefully he felt all around the walls, and was certain that his fingers detected an inscription chiseled in the stone.

Removal

In July 1890 a resident of Jerusalem had the inscription removed from the wall of the tunnel; during this work the inscription cracked into six to seven pieces and several letters were injured at the breakpoints.

The Ottoman government in Jerusalem, led by the Mutasarrif of Jerusalem, Ibrahim Hakki Pasha, did not become aware of what had happened until the end of the year, when they were alerted by the director of the Turkish Museum in Istanbul. Under Ottoman law, the government was the owner of all ancient monuments found within the empire, so they launched a search for the inscription. During 1891, both the real and a forged copy were given to Ibrahim Hakki Pasha; the Mutasarrif put the inscription on display in the Jerusalem Serāj, where it was viewed by large crowds. The inscription was subsequently sent to Istanbul.

Casts of the inscription in situ had been made by Hermann Guthe in 1881; one was held by the Schneller Orphanage, the second broke during the transport to Germany and a third was held by the Deutscher Verein zur Erforschung Palästinas (German Association for the Exploration of Palestine, DVEP).

Biblical references
The ancient city of Jerusalem, being on a mountain, was naturally defensible from almost all sides but its major source of fresh water, the Gihon spring, was on the side of the cliff overlooking the Kidron valley. The Bible records that King Hezekiah, fearful that the Assyrians would lay siege to the city, blocked the spring's water outside the city and diverted it through a channel into the Pool of Siloam.
 2 Kings 20, 20: "And the rest of the events of Hezekiah and all his mighty deeds, and how he made the conduit and the pool, and he brought the water into the city, they are written in the book of the chronicles of the kings of Judah."
 2 Chronicles 32, 3–4: "And he took counsel with his officers and his mighty men to stop up the waters of the fountains that were outside the city, and they assisted him. And a large multitude gathered and stopped up all the fountains and the stream that flowed in the midst of the land, saying, "Why should the kings of Assyria come and find much water?""

Translation

As the inscription was unreadable at first due to the deposits, Professor Archibald Sayce was the first to make a tentative reading, and later the text was cleaned with an acid solution making the reading more legible. The inscription contains 6 lines, of which the first is damaged. The words are separated by dots. Only the word zada on the third line is of doubtful translation—perhaps a crack or a weak part.

The passage reads:
... the tunnel ... and this is the story of the tunnel while ...
the axes were against each other and while three cubits were left to (cut?) ... the voice of a man ...
called to his counterpart, (for) there was ZADA in the rock, on the right ... and on the day of the
tunnel (being finished) the stonecutters struck each man towards his counterpart, ax against ax and flowed
water from the source to the pool for 1,200 cubits. and (100?)
cubits was the height over the head of the stonecutters ...

The inscription hence records the construction of the tunnel; according to the text the work began at both ends simultaneously and proceeded until the stonecutters met in the middle. However, this idealised account does not quite reflect the reality of the tunnel; where the two sides meet is an abrupt right angled join, and the centres do not line up. It has been theorized that Hezekiah’s engineers depended on acoustic sounding to guide the tunnelers and this is supported by the explicit use of this technique as described in the Siloam Inscription. The frequently ignored final sentence of this inscription provides further evidence: "And the height of the rock above the heads of the laborers was 100 cubits." This indicates that the engineers were well aware of the distance to the surface above the tunnel at various points in its progression.

While traditionally identified as a commemorative inscription, one archaeologist has suggested that it may be a votive offering inscription.

Return of inscription

The inscription is on exhibition at the Istanbul Archaeology Museum, one of three ancient inscriptions from the region held by the museum (the other two being the Gezer calendar and the Temple Warning inscription). A replica is on display at the Israel Museum in Jerusalem.

Turkey has refused Israel's request to be sent the Siloam inscription (and other artifacts unearthed in Ottoman Palestine and transferred to Turkey). Scholars have commented that the inscription has little, if any, significance to Turkey, and as evidence point to the fact that it was not on display in a public gallery in the Istanbul Archaeology Museum. Hershel Shanks, founder of the Biblical Archaeology Review, has written that Turkey should be amenable to a repatriation of the Siloam inscription, given its own repatriation efforts, and other scholars have questioned whether Turkey can demand that its objects be returned, when its own museums refuse to return artifacts taken from previous colonies.

In September 1998, Benjamin Netanyahu asked then-Turkish prime minister Mesut Yılmaz to return the inscription and, in return, offered Turkey "to go into [Israel's] museums and choose all the finds from the Ottoman period that you want". His offer was rejected.

In 2007, Jerusalem Mayor Uri Lupolianski met with Turkey's ambassador to Israel, Namık Tan, and requested that the tablet be returned to Jerusalem as a "goodwill gesture". Turkey rejected the request, stating that the Siloam inscription was Imperial Ottoman property, and thus the cultural property of the Turkish Republic. President Abdullah Gul said that Turkey would arrange for the inscription to be shown in Jerusalem for a short period, but Turkey never followed though on this, as tensions between the two countries escalated as a result of Israel’s blockade of the Gaza Strip 

In 2017, Israeli Culture Minister Miri Regev made another offer for the inscription, perhaps jokingly suggesting Israel could provide two elephants for the Gaziantep Zoo in exchange for the inscription.

In March 2022, following the visit of President of Israel Isaac Herzog in Ankara, Israeli media reported that Turkey agreed to return the Siloam Inscription to Jerusalem. However, Turkish media stated that the Turkish government denied this, on the basis that the inscription was found in East Jerusalem, part of the Palestinian territories, "thus, it was out of the question to return it to Israel, a third country in Turkey's view".

See also
List of artifacts significant to the Bible
Archaeology of Israel
Biblical archaeology
Shebna inscription
Ophel inscription

References

Bibliography

 Conder, C.R. (1882), "The Siloam Tunnel", Palestine Exploration Fund Quarterly Statement, pp. 122–31.
 
 
 Puech, E. (1974), "L'inscription du tunnel de Siloie", RB 81, pp. 196–214
 Sayce, A. (1881), "The Inscription at the Pool of Siloam," Palestine Exploration Fund Quarterly Statement 13.2 (April 1881): 69–73 (editio princeps)
 Sayce, A. (1881), "The Ancient Hebrew Inscription Discovered at the Pool of Siloam in Jerusalem," Palestine Exploration Fund Quarterly Statement 13.3 (July 1881): 141–154.
 Sayce, A.; Conder, C.R.; Taylor, Isaac; Beswick, Samuel & Sulley, H. (1881), "The Ancient Hebrew Inscription Discovered at the Pool of Siloam," Palestine Exploration Fund Quarterly Statement 13.4 (Oct. 1881): 282–297.
 
 Schick, C., "Phoenician Inscription in the Pool of Siloam", Palestine Exploration Fund Quarterly Statement, 1880, pp. 238–39.
 Waterman, H.B. (1882), The Siloam Inscription, The Hebrew Student, Vol. 1, No. 3 (Jun., 1882), pp. 52–53, Published by: The University of Chicago Press

External links

 A clearer photo of the inscription
 Siloam Inscription - Transcription and Vocalization
 Jewish Encyclopedia: Siloam Inscription with image
 Catholic Encyclopedia: "Siloe"
 Turkish president opens exhibition in Brussels without biblical artefact 

8th-century BC inscriptions
1880 archaeological discoveries
Hebrew inscriptions
KAI inscriptions
8th century BC in the Kingdom of Judah
Siloam
Ancient sites in Jerusalem
Votive offering
Collection of the Istanbul Archaeology Museums
Art and cultural repatriation
Hezekiah